Matt Danowski (born August 12, 1985) is a former professional lacrosse Attackman who played in Major League Lacrosse (MLL) and the Premier Lacrosse League (PLL) for 12 seasons. He finished his career with the Chrome Lacrosse Club, announcing his retirement on February 22, 2021. He previously played for the Chesapeake Bayhawks, Charlotte Hounds, New York Lizards, and the New Jersey Pride. Danowski also spent four seasons playing professional indoor lacrosse in the National Lacrosse League for the Colorado Mammoth, Rochester Knighthawks and Philadelphia Wings. He was a four-time college All-American at Duke University, won the Tewaaraton Trophy in 2007, and was the NCAA Division I all-time leading scorer at the time of his graduation with 353 points. He is now fifth all-time on that list behind Lyle Thompson (400), Pat Spencer (380), Connor Fields (364), and Rob Pannell (354).

Collegiate career
Danowski was a starter at Duke throughout his entire college career. As a sophomore in 2005, he won the Jack Turnbull Award, given to the nation's top collegiate attackman.

Danowski was a member of Duke squad during the 2006 Duke University lacrosse team scandal, cutting short his junior campaign to eight games after the University prematurely ended the season.  Following the forced resignation of long-time Duke lacrosse coach Mike Pressler, Danowski's father, John Danowski, became the head coach of the team.  Due to the shortened season, resulting from "unusual circumstance," the NCAA granted 33 Duke lacrosse players, including Danowski, a rare fifth year of eligibility.

Danowski, and teammate Zack Greer, led the Blue Devils high-powered attack to the 2007 NCAA Final Four. Duke faced Johns Hopkins University in the final, but lost despite mounting a strong comeback at the end of the game, This match-up was a repeat of the 2005 NCAA Division I Men's Lacrosse Championship game.

In 2007, Danowski won the Tewaaraton Trophy, awarded to the nation's most outstanding collegiate lacrosse player.  That year, he also won the USILA's Lt. Raymond Enners Award as the national player of the year, and his second Jack Turnbull Award as attackman of the year.

In the first round of the 2008 NCAA Division I Men's Lacrosse Championship, in a victory over Loyola, Danowski broke the NCAA career points record, eclipsing Joe Vasta's mark.  However, in the 2008 NCAA semifinals, Duke was again defeated by Johns Hopkins, ending Danowski's collegiate career without winning an NCAA championship. In 2008, he was again awarded the Lt. Raymond Enners Award as national player of the year.

Professional career
Only a few days after Danowski was awarded the 2008 Enners award as the USILA player of the year, he was drafted second overall by the New Jersey Pride in the 2008 Major League Lacrosse Collegiate Draft.

Danowski earned Rookie of the Week honors in Week 5 of the 2008 MLL season. He has scored 19 goals in 12 games with 3 two-point goals and 14 assists giving him a total of 36 points.

In July 2009, Danowski was traded from the Colorado Mammoth to the New York Titans in exchange for Ryan Powell. Danowski becomes the fourth player in 2009 to play both for the Lizards of the MLL and the Titans of the NLL in the same season, joining Stephen Peyser, Matt Zash, and Keith Cromwell.

In 2011, Danowski was traded from the Long Island Lizards to the Charlotte Hounds along with Stephen Berger and two other draft picks in exchange for the No.1 pick in the 2012 MLL Collegiate Draft Pick. The Hounds also gave up former Boston Canon MLL-All Star Max Quinzani whom Charlotte just picked up in the expansion draft.

Danowski joined roughly 140 professional players leaving the MLL for the newly formed PLL in 2018. He was an important staple for the Chrome Lacrosse Club during the inaugural 2019 season, playing in all ten games. Danowski did not play during the shortened 2020 season bubble tournament during the COVID-19 pandemic, and on February 22, 2021, he announced his retirement from professional lacrosse.

Family
Matt Danowski's father, John Danowski, is the Duke men's lacrosse head coach since June 2006. Matt's grandfather, Ed Danowski, was as a quarterback for the New York Giants and led them to two championships in 1935 and 1938.

Statistics

Duke University

 (a) 6th in NCAA Division I career assists
 (b) 3rd in NCAA Division I career points

MLL & PLL

National Lacrosse League

Awards
 Seven-time MLL All-Star (2008, 2009, 2010, 2011, 2012, 2013, 2014)
 Tewaaraton Trophy (2007)
 Four-time USILA All-American (2004, 2005, 2007, 2008)
 Lt. Raymond Enners Award (2007, 2008)
 Jack Turnbull Award (2005, 2007)
 Atlantic Coast Conference Player of the Year (2005)
 Atlantic Coast Conference Rookie of the Year (2004)

See also
NCAA Lacrosse Records

References

1985 births
Living people
American lacrosse players
Duke Blue Devils men's lacrosse players
Major League Lacrosse players
People from Farmingdale, New York
Lacrosse players from New York (state)
Sportspeople from Nassau County, New York